This article lists enzymes by their classification in the International Union of Biochemistry and Molecular Biology's Enzyme Commission (EC) numbering system.

 List of EC numbers (EC 5)
 List of EC numbers (EC 6)

:Category:Oxidoreductases (EC 1) (Oxidoreductase)
Dehydrogenase
Luciferase
DMSO reductase

:Category:EC 1.1 (act on the CH-OH group of donors)
:Category:EC 1.1.1 (with NAD+ or NADP+ as acceptor)
Alcohol dehydrogenase (NAD) 
Alcohol dehydrogenase (NADP) 
Homoserine dehydrogenase 
Aminopropanol oxidoreductase 
Diacetyl reductase 
Glycerol dehydrogenase 
Propanediol-phosphate dehydrogenase 
glycerol-3-phosphate dehydrogenase (NAD+) 
D-xylulose reductase 
L-xylulose reductase 
Lactate dehydrogenase 
Malate dehydrogenase 
Isocitrate dehydrogenase 
HMG-CoA reductase 
:Category:EC 1.1.2 (with a cytochrome as acceptor)
:Category:EC 1.1.3 (with oxygen as acceptor)
Glucose oxidase 
L-gulonolactone oxidase 
Thiamine oxidase 
Xanthine oxidase 
:Category:EC 1.1.4 (with a disulfide as acceptor)
:Category:EC 1.1.5 (with a quinone or similar compound as acceptor)
:Category:EC 1.1.99 (with other acceptors)

:Category:EC 1.2 (act on the aldehyde or oxo group of donors)
:Category:EC 1.2.1 (with NAD+ or NADP+ as acceptor)
Acetaldehyde dehydrogenase 
Glyceraldehyde 3-phosphate dehydrogenase 
Pyruvate dehydrogenase 
:Category:EC 1.2.4
Oxoglutarate dehydrogenase

:Category:EC 1.3 (act on the CH-CH group of donors)
:Category:EC 1.3.1 (with NAD+ or NADP+ as acceptor)
Biliverdin reductase 
:Category:EC 1.3.2 (with a cytochrome as acceptor)
:Category:EC 1.3.3 (with oxygen as acceptor)
Protoporphyrinogen oxidase 
:Category:EC 1.3.5 (with a quinone or similar compound as acceptor)
:Category:EC 1.3.7 (with an iron–sulfur protein as acceptor)
:Category:EC 1.3.99 (with other acceptors)

:Category:EC 1.4 (act on the CH-NH2 group of donors)
:Category:EC 1.4.3
Monoamine oxidase

:Category:EC 1.5 (act on CH-NH group of donors)
:Category:EC 1.5.1 (with NAD+ or NADP+ as acceptor)
Dihydrofolate reductase 
Methylenetetrahydrofolate reductase 
:Category:EC 1.5.3 (with oxygen as acceptor)
Sarcosine oxidase 
Dihydrobenzophenanthridine oxidase 
:Category:EC 1.5.4 (with a disulfide as acceptor)
:Category:EC 1.5.5 (with a quinone or similar compound as acceptor)
:Category:EC 1.5.7 (with an iron–sulfur protein as acceptor)
:Category:EC 1.5.8 (with a flavin as acceptor)
:Category:EC 1.5.99 (with other acceptors)

:Category:EC 1.6 (act on NADH or NADPH)
:Category:EC 1.6.1 (with NAD+ or NADP+ as acceptor)
:Category:EC 1.6.2 (with a cytochrome as acceptor)
:Category:EC 1.6.3 (with oxygen as acceptor)
Category:EC 1.6.4 now :Category:EC 1.8.1
:Category:EC 1.6.5 (with a quinone or similar compound as acceptor)
NADH dehydrogenase 
:Category:EC 1.6.6 (with a nitrogenous group as acceptor)
Category:EC 1.6.7 now :Category:EC 1.18.1
Category:EC 1.6.8 now :Category:EC 1.5.1
:Category:EC 1.6.99 (with other acceptors)

:Category:EC 1.7 (act on other nitrogenous compounds as donors)
:Category:EC 1.7.1 (with NAD+ or NADP+ as acceptor)
:Category:EC 1.7.2 (with a cytochrome as acceptor)
:Category:EC 1.7.3 (with oxygen as acceptor)
Urate oxidase 
:Category:EC 1.7.7 (with an iron–sulfur protein as acceptor)
:Category:EC 1.7.99 (with other acceptors)
Nitrite reductase 
Nitrate reductase

:Category:EC 1.8 (act on a sulfur group of donors)
:Category:EC 1.8.1 (with NAD+ or NADP+ as acceptor)
Glutathione reductase 
Thioredoxin reductase 
:Category:EC 1.8.2 (with a cytochrome as acceptor)
:Category:EC 1.8.3 (with oxygen as acceptor)
Sulfite oxidase 
:Category:EC 1.8.4 (with a disulfide as acceptor)
:Category:EC 1.8.5 (with a quinone or similar compound as acceptor)
Category:EC 1.8.6 deleted, included in EC 2.5.1.18
:Category:EC 1.8.7 (with an iron–sulfur protein as acceptor)
:Category:EC 1.8.98 (with other, known, acceptors)
:Category:EC 1.8.99 (with other acceptors)

:Category:EC 1.9 (act on a heme group of donors)
:Category:EC 1.9.3 (with oxygen as acceptor)
Cytochrome c oxidase 
:Category:EC 1.9.6 (with a nitrogenous as acceptor)
Category:EC 1.9.99 transferred, now EC 1.9.98.1

:Category:EC 1.10 (act on diphenols and related substances as donors)
:Category:EC 1.10.1(with NAD+ or NADP+ as acceptor)
:Category:EC 1.10.2 (with a cytochrome as acceptor)
Coenzyme Q - cytochrome c reductase 
:Category:EC 1.10.3 (with oxygen as acceptor)
Catechol oxidase 
Laccase 
:Category:EC 1.10.99 (with other acceptors)

:Category:EC 1.11 (act on peroxide as an acceptor -- peroxidases)
:Category:EC 1.11.1 (peroxidases)
Cytochrome c peroxidase 
Catalase 
Myeloperoxidase 
Thyroid peroxidase 
Glutathione peroxidase

:Category:EC 1.12 (act on hydrogen as a donor)
:Category:EC 1.12.1 (with NAD+ or NADP+ as acceptor)
:Category:EC 1.12.2 (with a cytochrome as acceptor)
:Category:EC 1.12.5 (with a quinone or similar compound as acceptor)
:Category:EC 1.12.7 (with an iron–sulfur protein as acceptor)
:Category:EC 1.12.98 (with other known acceptors)
:Category:EC 1.12.99 (with other acceptors)

:Category:EC 1.13 (act on single donors with incorporation of molecular oxygen)
:Category:EC 1.13.11 (With incorporation of two atoms of oxygen)
4-hydroxyphenylpyruvate dioxygenase
:Category:EC 1.13.12 (With incorporation of one atom of oxygen (internal monooxygenases or internal mixed function oxidases))
Renilla-luciferin 2-monooxygenase 
Cypridina-luciferin 2-monooxygenase 
Firefly luciferase 
Watasenia-luciferin 2-monooxygenase 
Oplophorus-luciferin 2-monooxygenase

:Category:EC 1.14 (act on paired donors with incorporation of molecular oxygen)
Cytochrome P450 oxidase
:Category:Cytochrome P450
Aromatase 
CYP2D6 
CYP2E1 
CYP3A4 
Cytochrome P450 oxidase
:Category:EC 1.14.12
Nitric oxide dioxygenase
:Category:EC 1.14.13
Nitric oxide synthase 
:Category:EC 1.14.14
Aromatase 
CYP2D6 
CYP2E1 
CYP3A4 
:Category:EC 1.14.16
Phenylalanine hydroxylase 
:Category:EC 1.14.18
Tyrosinase

:Category:EC 1.15 (act on superoxide radicals as acceptors)
:Category:EC 1.15.1
Superoxide dismutase

:Category:EC 1.16 (oxidize metal ions)
:Category:EC 1.16.3
Ceruloplasmin

:Category:EC 1.17 (act on CH or CH2 groups)
:Category:EC 1.17.1
Leucoanthocyanidin reductase 
Xanthine dehydrogenase 
Nicotinate dehydrogenase 
4-hydroxy-tetrahydrodipicolinate reductase 
:Category:EC 1.17.2
Nicotinate dehydrogenase (cytochrome) 
:Category:EC 1.17.3
Xanthine oxidase 
:Category:EC 1.17.4
Ribonucleotide reductase 
Ribonucleoside-triphosphate reductase 
Vitamin K epoxide reductase
Vitamin-K-epoxide reductase (warfarin-sensitive) 
Vitamin-K-epoxide reductase (warfarin-insensitive) 
RRM1
RRM2
RRM2B
:Category:EC 1.17.5
Caffeine dehydrogenase 
:Category:EC 1.17.7
:Category:EC 1.17.99

:Category:EC 1.18 (act on iron–sulfur proteins as donors)
:Category:EC 1.18.6
Nitrogenase

:Category:EC 1.19 (act on reduced flavodoxin as donor)
:Category:EC 1.19.6
Nitrogenase (flavodoxin)

:Category:EC 1.20 (act on phosphorus or arsenic as donors)
:Category:EC 1.20.1
:Category:EC 1.20.2
:Category:EC 1.20.4
Arsenate reductase (glutaredoxin) 
Glutaredoxin 
:Category:EC 1.20.9
:Category:EC 1.20.99

:Category:EC 1.21 (act on X-H and Y-H to form an X-Y bond)
:Category:EC 1.21.1
Iodotyrosine deiodinase 
:Category:EC 1.21.3
Isopenicillin N synthase 
Tetrahydrocannabinolic acid synthase 
:Category:EC 1.21.4
:Category:EC 1.21.99
Thyroxine 5-deiodinase 
Iodothyronine deiodinase  and

:Category:EC 1.97 (other oxidoreductases)
:Category:EC 1.97.1
Deiodinase

:Category:Transferases (EC 2) (Transferase)
 Glutathione S-transferase

:Category:EC 2.1 (transfer one-carbon groups, Methylase)
:Category:EC 2.1.1
Catechol-O-methyl transferase 
Histone methyltransferase  ,  
:Category:EC 2.1.3
Aspartate transcarbamoylase 
Ornithine transcarbamoylase

:Category:EC 2.2 (transfer aldehyde or ketone groups)
:Category:EC 2.2.1
Transketolase 
Transaldolase 
Acetolactate synthase 
2-Succinyl-5-enolpyruvyl-6-hydroxy-3-cyclohexene-1-carboxylic-acid synthase

:Category:EC 2.3 (acyltransferases)
:Category:EC 2.3.1
Aminolevulinic acid synthase 
Choline acetyltransferase 
:Category:EC 2.3.2
Factor XIII 
Gamma glutamyl transpeptidase 
Transglutaminase

:Category:EC 2.4 (glycosyltransferases)
:Category:EC 2.4.2
Hypoxanthine-guanine phosphoribosyltransferase 
:Category:EC 2.5
:Category:EC 2.5.1
Thiaminase

:Category:EC 2.5 (transfer alkyl or aryl groups, other than methyl groups)
Flavin prenyltransferase

:Category:EC 2.6 (transfer nitrogenous groups)
:Category:EC 2.6.1
Alanine transaminase 
Aspartate transaminase

:Category:EC 2.7 (transfer phosphorus-containing groups)
 :Category:EC 2.7.2
 Butyrate kinase

:Category:EC 2.8 (transfer sulfur-containing groups)
 : Thiosulfate sulfurtransferase
 : 3-mercaptopyruvate sulfurtransferase
 : Thiosulfate—thiol sulfurtransferase
 : tRNA uracil 4-sulfurtransferase
 : Thiosulfate—dithiol sulfurtransferase
 : Biotin synthase
 : Cysteine desulfurase
 : Lipoyl synthase
 : Molybdenum cofactor sulfurtransferase
 : Thiazole synthase
 : Molybdopterin synthase sulfurtransferase
 : Molybdopterin synthase
 : tRNA-uridine 2-sulfurtransferase
 : tRNA-5-taurinomethyluridine 2-sulfurtransferase
 : tRNA-5-methyluridine(54) 2-sulfurtransferase

:Category:EC 2.9 (transfer selenium-containing groups)
 : L-seryl-tRNA(Sec) selenium transferase
 : O-phospho-L-seryl-tRNA(Sec):L-selenocysteinyl-tRNA synthase

:Category:Hydrolases (EC 3) (Hydrolase) 
 Hydrolytic enzyme

:Category:EC 3.1 (act on ester bonds)
Nuclease
Endonuclease
Exonuclease
:Category:EC 3.1.1
Acid hydrolase
Phospholipase A
Acetylcholinesterase
Cholinesterase
Lipoprotein lipase
:Category:EC 3.1.2
Ubiquitin carboxy-terminal hydrolase L1
:Category:EC 3.1.3
Phosphatase
Alkaline phosphatase
Fructose bisphosphatase
:Category:EC 3.1.4
Phospholipase C
CGMP specific phosphodiesterase type 5
Phospholipase D
:Category:EC 3.1.21
Restriction enzyme Type 1
Restriction enzyme Type 2
Restriction enzyme Type 3
Restriction enzyme Type 4 (?)
Deoxyribonuclease I
:Category:EC 3.1.26
RNase H
:Category:EC 3.1.27
Ribonuclease

:Category:EC 3.2 (act on sugars - glycosylases)
:Category:EC 3.2.1
Amylase
Sucrase
Chitinase
Lysozyme
Maltase
Lactase
Beta-galactosidase
Hyaluronidase

Function and clinical importance of some enzymes in category 3.2.1

Amylase 
Function: Amylase is an enzyme that is responsible for the breaking of the bonds in starches, polysaccharides, and complex carbohydrates to be turned into simple sugars that will be easier to absorb.

Clinical Significance: Amylase also has medical history in the use of Pancreatic Enzyme Replacement Therapy (PERT). One of the components is Sollpura (liprotamase), which help in the breakdown of saccharides into simple sugars.

Lysozyme  
Function: An enzyme that is produced by animals that forms part of the innate immune system and is abundant in the secretions of saliva, human milk, tears, and mucus. It functions as an antimicrobial agent by splitting the peptidoglycan component of bacterial cell walls, which then leads to cell death. 

Clinical Significance: Toxic levels of blood are caused by the excessive production of lysozyme's by cancer cells. Lysozyme's have also been associated with Bronchopulmonary dysplasia (BPD) in newborns and is a key factor in providing the immunology of infants during breast feeding.

Sucrase  
Function: Sucrase is a stomachs related protein that mobilizes hydrolysis to convert sucrose into glucose and fructose.  

Clinical Significance: Low amounts of Sucrose also known as Sucrose intolerance happens when sucrose isn’t being discharged in the small digestive tract. A result of this is extra gas.

Lactase  
Function: lactase is located in the small digestives system of people and other creatures such as mammals. Lactase is the bases of the total absorption of milk. 

Clinical Significance: People who are lactose intolerant have medicine that can help with the digestion. When you are lactose intolerant you might experience gas, bloating, and pain along with other symptoms regarding your digestive system.

:Category:EC 3.3 (act on ether bonds)
:Category:EC 3.3
 Adenosylmethionine hydrolase
 S-adenosyl-L-homocysteine hydrolase
 Alkenylglycerophosphocholine hydrolase
 Alkenylglycerophosphoethanolamine hydrolase
 Cholesterol-5,6-oxide hydrolase
 Hepoxilin-epoxide hydrolase
 Isochorismatase
 Leukotriene-A4 hydrolase
 Limonene-1,2-epoxide hydrolase
 Microsomal epoxide hydrolase
 Trans-epoxysuccinate hydrolase

:Category:EC 3.4 (act on peptide bonds - Peptidase)
:Category:EC 3.4.11
Alanine aminopeptidase
:Category:EC 3.4.15
Angiotensin converting enzyme
:Category:EC 3.4.21
Serine protease
Chymotrypsin
Trypsin
Thrombin
Factor X
Plasmin
Acrosin
Factor VII
Factor IX
Prolyl oligopeptidase
Factor XI
Elastase
Factor XII
Proteinase K
Tissue plasminogen activator
Protein C
:Category:EC 3.4.22
Separase
:Category:EC 3.4.23
Pepsin
Rennet
Renin
Trypsinogen and (20/21/23/24/26)
Plasmepsin
:Category:EC 3.4.24
Matrix metalloproteinase
:Category:EC 3.4.25
Metalloendopeptidase

:Category:EC 3.5 (act on carbon–nitrogen bonds, other than peptide bonds)
:Category:EC 3.5.1 (In linear amides)
Urease
:Category:EC 3.5.2 (In cyclic amides)
Beta-lactamase
:Category:EC 3.5.3 (In linear amidines)
Arginase
:Category:EC 3.5.4 (In cyclic amidines)
Adenosine deaminase
GTP cyclohydrolase I
:Category:EC 3.5.5 (In nitriles)
Nitrilase

:Category:EC 3.6 (act on acid anhydrides)
:Category:EC 3.6.1
Helicase
DnaB helicase
RecQ helicase
:Category:EC 3.6.3
ATPase
NaKATPase
ATP synthase

:Category:EC 3.7 (act on carbon–carbon bonds)
 Kynureninase

:Category:EC 3.8 (act on halide bonds)
 EC 3.8.1.3 Haloacetate dehalogenase

:Category:EC 3.9 (act on phosphorus–nitrogen bonds)
 : Phosphoamidase
 : Protein arginine phosphatase
 : Phosphohistidine phosphatase

:Category:EC 3.10 (act on sulfur–nitrogen bonds)
 : N-sulfoglucosamine sulfohydrolase
 : Cyclamate sulfohydrolase

:Category:EC 3.11 (act on carbon–phosphorus bonds)
 : Phosphonoacetaldehyde hydrolase
 : Phosphonoacetate hydrolase
 : Phosphonopyruvate hydrolase

:Category:EC 3.12 (act on sulfur–sulfur bonds)
 : Trithionate hydrolase

:Category:EC 3.13 (act on carbon–sulfur bonds)
 : UDP-sulfoquinovose synthase
 : 2'-hydroxybiphenyl-2-sulfinate desulfinase
 : 3-sulfinopropanoyl—CoA desulfinase
 : Carbon disulfide hydrolase
 : (CysO sulfur-carrier protein)-S-L-cysteine hydrolase
 : Carbonyl sulfide hydrolase
 : S-adenosyl-L-methionine hydrolase (adenosine-forming)

:Category:Lyases (EC 4) (Lyase)

:Category:EC 4.1 (carbon–carbon lyases)
:Category:EC 4.1.1
Ornithine decarboxylase
Uridine monophosphate synthetase
Aromatic-L-amino-acid decarboxylase
RubisCO
:Category:EC 4.1.2
Fructose-bisphosphate aldolase

:Category:EC 4.2 (carbon–oxygen lyases)
:Category:EC 4.2.1
Carbonic anhydrase
Tryptophan synthase

:Category:EC 4.3 (carbon–nitrogen lyases)
:Category:EC 4.3.1
Phenylalanine ammonia-lyase

:Category:EC 4.4 (carbon–sulfur lyases)
:Category:EC 4.4.1
Cystathionine gamma-lyase
Cystathionine beta-lyase
Leukotriene C4 synthase

:Category:EC 4.5 (carbon–halide lyases)
:Category:EC 4.5.1
Dichloromethane dehalogenase
Halohydrin dehalogenase

:Category:EC 4.6 (phosphorus–oxygen lyases)
:Category:EC 4.6.1
Adenylate cyclase
Guanylate cyclase

:Category:Isomerases (EC 5) (Isomerase)

:Category:EC 5.1 (racemases and epimerases)
:Category:EC 5.1.1
 Amino-acid racemase: Phenylalanine racemase (ATP-hydrolysing)
 Serine racemase
:Category:EC 5.1.2
 Mandelate racemase
:Category:EC 5.1.3
 UDP-glucose 4-epimerase
:Category:EC 5.1.99
 Methylmalonyl CoA epimerase

:Category:EC 5.2 (cis-trans-isomerases)
:Category:EC 5.2
 FKBP: FKBP1A
 FKBP1B
 FKBP2
 FKBP3
 FKBP4
 FKBP5
 FKBP6
 FKBP8
 FKBP9
 FKBP10
 FKBPL
 Cyclophilin
 Parvulin
 Prolyl isomerase
 2-chloro-4-carboxymethylenebut-2-en-1,4-olide isomerase
 Beta-carotene isomerase
 Farnesol 2-isomerase
 Furylfuramide isomerase
 Linoleate isomerase
 Maleate isomerase
 Maleylacetoacetate isomerase
 Maleylpyruvate isomerase
 Parvulin
 Photoisomerase
 Prolycopene isomerase
 Prolyl isomerase
 Retinal isomerase
 Retinol isomerase
 Zeta-carotene isomerase

:Category:EC 5.3 (intramolecular oxidoreductases)
:Category:EC 5.3.3
Enoyl CoA isomerase
:Category:EC 5.3.4
Protein disulfide isomerase

:Category:EC 5.4 (intramolecular transferases -- mutases)
:Category:EC 5.4.2
Phosphoglucomutase

:Category:EC 5.5 (intramolecular lyases)

:Category:EC 5.99 (other isomerases)
 :Category:EC 5.99.1
 Topoisomerase (type I: ,)

:Category:Ligases (EC 6) (Ligase)

:Category:EC 6.1 (form carbon–oxygen bonds)
6-carboxytetrahydropterin synthase

 :Category:EC 6.1.1
 FARSB

:Category:EC 6.2 (form carbon–sulfur bonds)
 : Acetate—CoA ligase
 : Medium-chain acyl—CoA ligase
 : Long-chain-fatty-acid—CoA ligase
 : Succinate—CoA ligase (GDP-forming)
 : Succinate—CoA ligase (ADP-forming)
 : Glutarate—CoA ligase
 : Cholate—CoA ligase
 : Oxalate—CoA ligase
 : Malate—CoA ligase
 : Acid—CoA ligase (GDP-forming)
 : Biotin—CoA ligase
 : 4-coumarate—CoA ligase
 : Acetate—CoA ligase (ADP-forming)
 : 6-carboxyhexanoate—CoA ligase
 : Arachidonate—CoA ligase
 : Acetoacetate—CoA ligase
 : Propionate—CoA ligase
 : Citrate—CoA ligase
 : Long-chain-fatty-acid-luciferin-component ligase
 : Long-chain-fatty-acid-(acyl-carrier-protein) ligase
 : Transferred entry: 6.2.1.30
 : (citrate (pro-3S)-lyase) ligase
 : Dicarboxylate—CoA ligase
 : Phytanate—CoA ligase
 : Benzoate—CoA ligase
 : o-succinylbenzoate—CoA ligase
 : 4-hydroxybenzoate—CoA ligase
 : 3-alpha,7-alpha-dihydroxy-5-beta-cholestanate—CoA ligase
 : Transferred entry: 6.2.1.7
 : Phenylacetate—CoA ligase
 : 2-furoate—CoA ligase
 : Anthranilate—CoA ligase
 : 4-chlorobenzoate—CoA ligase
 : Trans-feruloyl-CoA synthase
 : ACP-SH:acetate ligase
 : 3-hydroxypropionyl-CoA synthase
 : 3-hydroxybenzoate—CoA ligase
 : (2,2,3-trimethyl-5-oxocyclopent-3-enyl)acetyl-CoA synthase
 : (butirosin acyl-carrier protein)—L-glutamate ligase
 : 4-hydroxybutyrate-CoA ligase
 : 3-((3aS,4S,7aS)-7a-methyl-1,5-dioxo-octahydro-1H-inden-4-yl)propanoate-CoA ligase
 : 3-oxocholest-4-en-26-oate-CoA ligase
 : 2-hydroxy-7-methoxy-5-methyl-1-naphthoate-CoA ligase
 : 3-(methylthio)propionyl-CoA ligase
 : E1 ubiquitin-activating enzyme
 : L-allo-isoleucine--holo-CmaA peptidyl-carrier protein ligase
 : Medium-chain-fatty-acid-(acyl-carrier-protein) ligase
 : Carnitine-CoA ligase
 : Long-chain fatty acid adenylyltransferase FadD28
 : 4-hydroxybenzoate adenylyltransferase FadD22
 : 4-hydroxyphenylalkanoate adenylyltransferase FadD29
 : L-firefly luciferin-CoA ligase
 : L-proline-L-prolyl-carrier protein ligase
 : D-alanine-D-alanyl-carrier protein ligase
 : E1 SAMP-activating enzyme

:Category:EC 6.3 (form carbon–nitrogen bonds)
 Glutamine synthetase
 Argininosuccinate synthetase
 CTP synthase

:Category:EC 6.4 (form carbon–carbon bonds)
 Pyruvate carboxylase
 Acetyl-CoA carboxylase

:Category:EC 6.5 (form phosphoric ester bonds)
 DNA ligase

:Category:EC 6.6 (form nitrogen–metal bonds)

Enzymes
Enzymes